Stockholm Syndrome is an album by Backyard Babies, released in 2003.

Track listing
All songs by Backyard Babies, except where noted.
"Everybody Ready?!" - 3:06
"Earn the Crown" - 3:53
"A Song for the Outcast" - 3:49
"Minus Celsius" - 3:35
"Pigs for Swine" - 3:06
"One Sound" - 3:33
"Say When" - 2:32
"Year by Year" - 3:53
"Friends" - 2:49 (Nicke Borg, Monroe, Jones, Tyla, Joey Ramone, Persson, Clarke)
"Be Myself and I" - 3:40
"You Tell Me You Love Me You Lie" - 3:35
"Big Bad Wolf" (bonus track)
"Shut the Fuck Up" (bonus track)

The song "Friends" features an all-star line-up of special guests, including;

Joey Ramone (Ramones)
Michael Monroe (Hanoi Rocks)
Danko Jones
Tyla (Dogs D'Amour)
Nina Persson (The Cardigans)
Kory Clarke (Warrior Soul)
Andy Shernoff (The Dictators)
Top Ten (The Dictators)
Sami Yaffa (Hanoi Rocks)
T.P. 
Karmen Guy (Mad Juana)
Euroboy (Turbonegro)
Happy Tom (Turbonegro)
Corey Shields (Danko Jones)
Damon Richardson (Danko Jones)
Janis Tanaka (L7)
Donita Sparks (L7)
Suzi Gardner (L7)
TC
Jennifer Finch (L7)
Sarah Reitkopp (Halfcocked)
Anne Kadrovich-Johnson (Tuscaurora)
Blag Dahlia (The Dwarves)
Amir Chamdin (Infinite Mass)
Rodde Pencheff (Infinite Mass)
Nicke Andersson (The Hellacopters)
Björne Fröberg  (The Nomads)

Personnel
Backyard Babies
Nicke Borg - lead vocals, guitar
Dregen - lead guitar, vocals, percussion
Johan Blomqvist - bass guitar
Peder Carlsson - drums, backing vocals, percussion

References

2003 albums
Backyard Babies albums